Maria Helena "Marleen" van Rij (born 29 August 1950) is a retired Dutch rower. Her teams finished sixth at the 1977 World Championships and eights at the 1976 Summer Olympics in the coxed eights event.

References

 

1950 births
Living people
Dutch female rowers
Olympic rowers of the Netherlands
Rowers at the 1976 Summer Olympics
Sportspeople from Leiden